Poladlı (also, Poladly and Polatly) is a village and municipality in the Tartar Rayon of Azerbaijan.  It has a population of 441.

References 

Populated places in Tartar District